The Mad Death is a television serial made by BBC Scotland. It was filmed in 1981 and transmitted 2 years later in 1983.

Plot
The three-part series examined the effects of an outbreak of rabies in the United Kingdom and was noted for its occasionally chilling content.

Production
The music for the opening titles consisted of a voice whispering the first four lines of All Things Bright and Beautiful over a montage of animals' faces, distorted by a rippling water effect, symbolising the hydrophobia caused by rabies.

The episodes were filmed around Scotland including inside East Kilbride Shopping Centre.

The series has only ever been repeated once on BBC television, in 1985, although it was later shown on UK Gold in the 1990s. An edited version was made to film length and released on a VHS in the mid-'80s. It was released uncut on DVD on 7 May 2018.

Cast
Richard Heffer as Michael Hilliard 
Barbara Kellerman as Dr. Ann Maitland 
Richard Morant as Johnny Dalry 
Ed Bishop as Tom Siegler 
Valerie Holliman as Norma Siegler 
Debbi Blythe as Jane Stoddard 
Brenda Bruce as Miss Stonecroft
Jimmy Logan as Bill Stanton
Paul Brooke as Bob Nicol

Releases

The Mad Death was released on DVD in 2018 by Simply Media.

External links
 
 
 http://www.startrader.co.uk/Action%20TV/guide80s/maddeath.htm
 http://ufoseries.com/films/maddeath.html
 TV Cream

1983 Scottish television series debuts
1983 Scottish television series endings
BBC television dramas
1980s British television miniseries
BBC Scotland television shows
Films about viral outbreaks
1980s British drama television series
Television shows about viral outbreaks
Rabies in popular culture
English-language television shows
1980s Scottish television series